Alexandre (Alex-Andre) Magno is a Brazilian born  choreographer and director.  His dance styles include hip-hop, jazz, ballet, samba, flamenco, tango, salsa, and martial arts.  He has performed with Madonna, Yanni, Britney Spears, the Lido La Tourné, Ballet Hispanico, the Ringling Brothers Circus, and the Academy Awards. He also works with his own dance company, “Personna Dance Theatre".

Choreography

1993 - 2006
In 1993 Magno was choreographer for Madonna on her world tour and HBO special The Girlie Show, for which his work was highly praised in Daily Variety.

In 2001, Madonna worked with Magno again on her Drowned World Tour, adding tango, salsa, flamenco, karate, kung fu, Samurai sword work, a contortionist, and a traditional Javanese dancer. He was nominated for an Emmy award and an American Choreography Award for the tour.
Following Madonna's tour, Magno began working for the male pop group Plus One on their 2002 Obvious tour.

In 2002, Magno graduated from the New York Film Academy.

In 2003, Britney Spears asked Magno to choreograph for her ABC special and MTV club tour, for which his work was highly praised in Us Weekly.

In 2004, Magno was commissioned by the Norwegian company ODE choreograph their 10th anniversary show, to be titled Illusionatics.

In December 2005, Magno worked with flamenco guitarist Ron Benise, choreographing and staging Nights Of Fire a PBS television special, which incorporated flamenco, Afro-Cuban salsa, and samba. Magno then worked on Benise's 2006 National Tour; re-mounting, choreographing in addition to dancing as one of the lead performers with Benise.

Magno appeared in, directed and choreographed The Eternal a short film written by Zalman King, for the Bravo television network, which aired as part of the Forty Duce series.  He also choreographed for the show So You Think You Can Dance, on Fox, as one of the shows first guest choreographers.

Magno choreographed the video for the songSway by the Pussycat Dolls, from the soundtrack to the 2004 film Shall We Dance?.

In the beginning of 2006, Magno completed his work on Orfeu In The Carnival of Souls a full-length original ballet commissioned by New York's Ballet Hispanico.  In addition to conceiving and choreographing the ballet, he directed, produced the soundtrack, and co-wrote most of the original music made for the ballet. Orfeu In The Carnival Of Souls received a favorable review from Sara G. Levin in The Villager.

Magno produced original music for his ballets Rendezvous Liaison, Dejame Sonar and Orfeu In The Carnaval Of Souls.

He has been a dance trainer for Christina Applegate, Elizabeth Berkley, and Jennifer Lopez.

2008 - present

Magno collaborated with Yanni as artistic director and choreographer for Televisa, and for Yanni's 2008 PBS television special Yanni Voices, which featured the artists Natahan Pacheco, Chloe, Ender Thomas, Leslie Mills, José José, Lucero, Christian Castro, Olga Tañon and an orchestra . This special was nominated for a Luna Award in Mexico.

Magno produced, staged and choreographed "Benise The Spanish Guitar", he then went on to direct and choreograph the "Benise" 40 city US Tour, ending the tour at the "Chicago Theatre"

He is producer, co-writer and choreographer of Winds of Passion a series of three short films, linked into one drama feature film.

Magno created for the Norwegian dance company ODE La Rueda a Latin/Cuban ballet, with both established and new Latin artists, using Latin songs such as Celia Cruz’s single La Vida Es Un Carnaval.

Theater 

In 1989, Magno formed his own dance company, Personna Dance Theater.  He produced a five show series With Passion.  In 1998, he and his company were the featured company for Joinville, the dance festival in South America, where he received a special award for excellence in choreography.

In 1996, Magno was hired to choreograph, write, and compose Hiroshima Requiem, a dance concert commemorating the 50th anniversary of the bombing of Hiroshima in the Second World War.

He was later the director and choreographer and composer for the Parisian Lido Show Rendezvous Liaison, an original ballet for their upcoming world tour.

For the Ballet Hispanico in New York City, he created an original ballet based on Hispanic music of the 1940s and 1950s, Dejame Sonar.

In 2003, Magno was commissioned to create original works for Odyssey dance company, based on the mythic story of Euridice; an original ballet based on Shakespeare’s Othello for Origins Company combining Latin ballroom, jazz, and hip-hop; and a piece for the European company ODE.

He also choreographed for Franz Ferdinand Master of Illusion tour, the Hair 20th anniversary, Jfoxx and Jmen, and Love vs. Hate; A Romeo and Juliet Story.

Feature films and television62nd Academy Awards, which he co-choreographed with Paula AbdulIn Living Color, a television series in which he directed a dance segmentLord of Illusions a Clive Barker filmSomebody to Love, starring Rosie PerezLiquid Dreams, for which his choreography was favorably reviewed at the 1991 Cannes Film FestivalBrasil 500 Anos, a celebration of Brazil’s 500th birthdayThe Golden Eagle Awards for Nosostro TVJust a Dream'', a video for MCA recording artist Donna De Lory

References

Brazilian choreographers
Brazilian male dancers
Living people
Year of birth missing (living people)
New York Film Academy alumni
Contemporary dancers
20th-century Brazilian dancers
21st-century Brazilian dancers